Gigio Alberti (born 19 June 1956) is an Italian actor.

Background 
Born in Milan as Luigi Alberti, he studied at the acting school of the Piccolo Teatro, graduating in 1981. His career is mainly associated to Gabriele Salvatores, with whom he worked both on stage and in films, notably in Marrakech Express and Mediterraneo.

Pretty active on stage and on television, he is also a mime.

Selected filmography 
 Kamikazen: Last Night in Milan (1987)
 Marrakech Express (1989)
 Mediterraneo (1991)
 Sud (1993)
 Bonus malus (1993)
 Ferie d'agosto (1995)
 Bits and Pieces (1996)
 Nirvana (1997)
 Marriages (1998)
 All the Moron's Men (1999)
 Ecco fatto (1998) 
 My Mother's Smile (2002)
 Quo Vadis, Baby? (2005)
 The Bodyguard's Cure (2006) 
 Women vs. Men (2011)
 Human Capital (2013)
 Couch Potatoes (2017)
 Reckless (2018)

References

External links 

1956 births
Male actors from Milan
Italian male stage actors
Italian male film actors
Italian male television actors
Living people
Italian mimes